Hans Leu the Elder (1460–1507) was a Swiss painter, native to Zürich.

The Episcopal collection of the St. Gallen Abbey includes the main altar of the church of the Rüti Abbey, probably a late work by Hans Leu the Elder. During the Reformation in Zürich the altar came to the monastery Wurmsbach where it remained until 1798.

Leu's son was the painter and draftsman Hans Leu the Younger.

References

1460 births
1507 deaths
15th-century Swiss painters
16th-century Swiss painters
Swiss male painters